The 2015 Latvian First League (referred to as the komanda.lv Pirmā līga for sponsorship reasons) started on 29 March 2015 and ended on 7 November 2015.

Changes from last season

Team changes
The following teams have changed league since the 2014 season.

To First League
Promoted from Second League
 FC Caramba/Dinamo
 FK Staiceles Bebri
From Higher League B team championship (dublieru čempionāts)
 JDFS Alberts

From First League
Relegated to Second League
 FK Pļaviņas DM
Promoted to Higher League
 FB Gulbene
To Higher League B team championship (dublieru čempionāts)
 SFK United as FB Gulbene B team

Team overview

Stadia and locations

League table

Positions by round

Top scorers

External links 
 The First League on the Latvian Football Federation website
  League321.com - Latvian football league tables, records & statistics database. 

Latvian First League seasons
2
Latvia
Latvia